Moindou Bay or Baie Moundou is a bay in southwestern New Caledonia. It lies 50 km north of Saint Vincent Bay.Teremba Bay lies to the east and the town of Moindou just to the north.

References

Bays of New Caledonia